NRG Stadium, formerly Reliant Stadium, is a multi-purpose stadium in Houston, Texas, United States. Construction was completed in 2002, at a cost of $352 million and has a seating capacity of 72,220. It was the first NFL facility to have a retractable roof.

The stadium is the home of the National Football League's Houston Texans, the Houston Livestock Show and Rodeo, the Texas Bowl, many of the United States men's national soccer team's matches, Mexico national football team friendlies where El Tri serves as the host, and other events. The stadium served as the host facility for Super Bowls XXXVIII (2004) and LI (2017), and WrestleMania 25 (2009). The stadium will host multiple matches during the 2026 FIFA World Cup.

NRG Stadium is part of a collection of venues (including the Astrodome), which are collectively called NRG Park. The entire complex is named for NRG Energy under a 32-year, $300 million naming rights deal in 2000.

History
The Houston NFL Holdings group came to Populous (then HOK Sport) to begin the schematic design for the first-ever NFL retractable roof football stadium in 1997. The intention was to create a football stadium to replace the Astrodome that would operate like an open-air facility but have the intimacy and comfort of an indoor arena. With the design for football and the square footage requirements of the rodeo, the building was designed in the  range. Groundbreaking for the stadium was on March 9, 2000 and the building was officially topped off in October 2001. Construction was completed in 30 months.

The stadium opened on August 24, 2002, with a preseason game between the Miami Dolphins and Houston Texans which the Dolphins won 24–3. The stadium hosted its first regular season NFL football game between the Dallas Cowboys and the Houston Texans on September 8, 2002. The first rodeo was held in the stadium in February 2003.

During a Texans preseason game on August 30, 2012, against the Minnesota Vikings, an intoxicated fan fell to his death from an escalator.

On March 19, 2014, the stadium was renamed NRG Stadium, after NRG Energy, the parent company of Reliant Energy.

During the 2015 season, a permanent artificial surface was installed at NRG Stadium. The Texans had used a natural surface since the stadium opened, using a system of trays of sod similar to one used at Giants Stadium in its experiment with using a grass surface. In recent years, the stadium installed artificial turf to be used during high school and college games while keeping the grass for Texans games. After the Texans' home opener, complaints about the field conditions finally led to the installation of the artificial surface for Texans games. The surface brand is UBU Speed, which is part of Act Global.

In 2017, NRG Stadium selected Hellas Construction to install its Matrix Turf with Helix Technology at the stadium. The three year contract calls for a new turf field each year.

After hosting Super Bowl LI, further upgrades were made to keep NRG Stadium competitive with other new NFL venues. The stadium's first major renovation in 15 years modernized the office and team facilities.

Hurricane Ike damage
On the night of September 12–13, 2008 the stadium sustained damage from Hurricane Ike forcing the Houston Texans home opener scheduled for September 14 to be postponed. Part of the roof cladding came off, and there was wind and water damage to other sections of the stadium. There were also large pieces of debris inside the stadium from the hurricane and the stadium authority declared that the stadium did not suffer significant structural damage except for the roof, and the Texans would be able to play all of their 8 home games at Reliant Stadium with the roof open.

The Texans' home opener against the Baltimore Ravens was initially postponed one day from Sunday, September 14, 2008 to Monday, September 15, but when the extent of the damage from Hurricane Ike became known, the NFL rescheduled the Texans-Ravens game to week 10 (November 9, 2008), which was to have been the bye week for the Ravens and the Texans' scheduled home game against the Cincinnati Bengals. That game was rescheduled to week 8 (October 26), which was to have been the bye week for both the Texans and Bengals. The Bengals bye week was moved from October 26 to November 9, originally scheduled for the Ravens. Both the Texans and Ravens took their unexpected bye week in week 2, the weekend Hurricane Ike hit East Texas and the Gulf Coast, despite the fact that both teams were preparing that whole week to play that game as scheduled.

The stadium reopened on October 5, 2008 when the Texans hosted the Indianapolis Colts and hosted three additional home games in October.

The stadium was repaired by Houston-based rope access inspection and construction firm Reel Group Americas on February 13, 2009.

Design and technology

The stadium was designed by the architectural firms of Hermes Reed Architects and Lockwood, Andrews and Newnam who were teamed to create the Houston Stadium Consultants (HSC). The architects of Populous (then HOK Sport) and the HSC worked together with engineers from Walter P Moore and Uni-Systems to design the stadium utilizing the principles of kinetic architecture. The facility offers a sense of transparency, with its fabric roof and expansive areas of glazing. At night, the building appears to glow from within. The extensive use of glass provides an open-air feel to the concourses, which are open to the field of play. NRG Stadium has over 7,000 club seats, 186 luxury suites, and multiple lounges and bars. The stadium can be configured to utilize a  space for meetings, specialty functions, exhibits, and concerts.

One of the most notable aspects of the design is the stadium's retractable, fabric roof. The roof mechanization consists of two large panels that split apart at the 50 yard line, lying over and above each end zone when fully retracted. 10 parallel, tri-chord trusses ride on two parallel rails, each supported by a large, -long super-truss. Roof operation is controlled in the stadium press box via computer, containing live images of the travel path of each roof panel; plus, furnishing live feedback from all roof components throughout the operation. The roof panels can be opened or closed in as little as 7 minutes, moving at a speed of up to -per-minute.

One bleacher section behind the north end zone, called the "Bull Pen", is the designated fan section for the hometeam. The fans in the Bull Pen interact directly with the action on the field, helping to create and implement fan traditions, songs, chants, and other elements of the game-day experience for spectators all over the stadium. Fans in the Bull Pen are encouraged to stand throughout the game, sing, cheer, and otherwise support the team in an enthusiastic manner.

In 2011, Reliant updated their logo and therefore had to update their signage all over the stadium.

In December 2012, it was announced that, in order to help bring the Super Bowl back to Houston, the stadium's end zone displays would be replaced with the largest digital displays in any professional sports venue. This tops the previous record of AT&T Stadium in Arlington. This has since been topped by the digital display boards located in TIAA Bank Field, the home of the Jacksonville Jaguars, now home to the largest digital display boards in any stadium in the world.

Stadium usage

Sports

Football

The Houston Texans have played their home games at NRG Stadium (formerly Reliant Stadium) since their inception in 2002. The annual calendar consists of 8 regular season and 1-2 pre-season games, plus any playoff games the Texans host. The first game played was on August 24, 2002, in front of 69,432 in attendance as the Texans hosted the Miami Dolphins in their first preseason game. The first regular season game was played on September 8 of that year, where the expansion Texans defeated the Dallas Cowboys 19–10 in front of 69,604. The first Monday Night Football game in Texans history was held on December 1, 2008 at Reliant Stadium. Playing in front of a then-franchise-record crowd of 70,809, the Texans defeated the Jacksonville Jaguars 30–17. Since then that record crowd has been broken in the next 2 Texans home games of that season. Their December 7, 2008 home game against the Tennessee Titans saw a then-record crowd of 70,831 and the December 28, 2008 home finale against the Chicago Bears drew then a current franchise-crowd record of 70,838. That record was broken on November 23, 2009, when a record crowd of 71,153 was in attendance during the Texans' second ever Monday Night Football game against Houston's former NFL team, the Tennessee Titans. The Texans' home finale of the 2009 season against the New England Patriots on January 3, 2010 drew 71,029.

NRG Stadium has hosted 2 Super Bowls: Super Bowl XXXVIII (which was marred by a controversial halftime show) and Super Bowl LI (which was the first Super Bowl to go into overtime); both games pitted the New England Patriots against a team from the NFC South.

NRG Stadium hosted Super Bowl XXXVIII on February 1, 2004 where the New England Patriots defeated the Carolina Panthers, 32–29 in front of 71,525 in attendance.

NRG Stadium hosted the Texans' first playoff game in franchise history on January 7, 2012, with Houston defeating the Cincinnati Bengals 31–10 in an AFC wild card game, drawing 71,725, the largest crowd ever to see a Texans game at Reliant Stadium.

NRG Stadium hosted Super Bowl LI in 2017, in which the New England Patriots defeated the Atlanta Falcons 34-28 in the biggest comeback in Super Bowl history; it was also the first ever overtime game in Super Bowl history.

Rodeo
The Houston Livestock Show and Rodeo (or RodeoHouston) is a co-tenant of NRG Stadium. "The building is as much for the rodeo as it is for the National Football League," according to Leroy Shafer who is assistant general manager of the rodeo's marketing department. The rodeo is held three weeks in March, each year. During this time NRG Stadium also hosts an event on the Xtreme Bulls tour, the bull riding-only tour that is part of the PRCA, who also hosts the Houston Livestock Show and Rodeo.

The stadium includes a service area level to house rodeo livestock. The bulls, broncs, steers and roping calves are housed in the north end of the stadium under the lower bowl. Loading and unloading dock space to support the rodeo is located on the north end of the stadium. During rodeo performances, rolling doors will separate the dock into two receiving areas to isolate the food and concession deliveries from the rodeo equipment and livestock deliveries. A  concert performance stage is located at the south end of the stadium during rodeo events and is moved into the center of the facility by a hydraulic drive system for rodeo concert performances.

On February 25, 2012, the PBR brought its premier bull riding tour, the Built Ford Tough Series, to Reliant Stadium for the first time ever. It was the first time that a PBR event was a part of RodeoHouston. In addition, it was their first event in Houston in 11 years, after having previously held an event at the Compaq Center annually between 1998 and 2001.

College football
College football's Texas Bowl and Texas Kickoff are annually hosted at the stadium.  The first-ever edition of the Texas Bowl featured a game between Rutgers University and Kansas State University, with Rutgers winning 37–10.  The stadium hosted the Houston Bowl before the Texas Bowl's inception and also hosted both the 2002 and 2005 Big 12 Championship Games. The 2005 game featured Houston native Vince Young at quarterback for the University of Texas at Austin and led the Longhorns to a 70–3 rout of the University of Colorado in front of 71,107.  In addition, the East–West Shrine Game was held there in 2007.

A Bayou Classic game between Grambling State and Southern was held here in November 2005 due to Hurricane Katrina damage at the rivalry's usual venue of the Superdome.

Each of the city's two Division I FBS schools, the University of Houston and Rice University, has played regular season home games at NRG Stadium in the past.  The Houston–Rice football rivalry game, the Bayou Bucket Classic, was held there in 2004, and in 2011, the game was announced to be played at Reliant Stadium for the 2012 and 2013 seasons as well.

The stadium also hosts the "Battle of the Piney Woods" since 2010. It is one of the oldest football rivalries in Texas, featuring Division I FCS Sam Houston State University and Stephen F. Austin State University. The series was originally scheduled to run until 2013, before being extended to 2017, and finally in April 2015, the stadium was made the permanent home of the series.

The two largest historically black universities in Greater Houston, Texas Southern University and Prairie View A&M University, each have played selected regular season home games at NRG Stadium as well.

The SWAC Championship Game was held at the stadium from 2013 until 2017.

In 2017, NRG Stadium was announced as a future site for the College Football Playoff National Championship game; it will host the event on January 8, 2024 (ending the 2023 college football season), with the winners of the Rose and Sugar bowls in that game.

High school football
NRG Stadium is regularly utilized by varsity football teams as a neutral site during the University Interscholastic League football playoffs.

Soccer
NRG Stadium also hosts international soccer matches. The games are generally held in the spring and summer before the NFL season starts. The stadium hosted CONCACAF Gold Cup matches from 2005 to 2011. The Gold Cup matches in 2007 included Round 1 matches, and a quarterfinal doubleheader match. The venue's attendance record was set during a preparation match between the Mexico national team and the U.S. men's soccer team.

On February 6, 2008, USA–Mexico was held at Reliant Stadium to a capacity crowd of 70,103. The previous USA vs. Mexico match in Reliant Stadium drew a sellout crowd of 69,582 fans on May 8, 2003 and is the largest home crowd for the U.S. men's national team this decade, until the USA played Mexico for a capacity crowd of 79,156 fans in Giants Stadium in East Rutherford, New Jersey for the 2009 CONCACAF Gold Cup Final.

Reliant Stadium hosted the 2010 MLS All-Star Game as 70,728 fans watched Manchester United defeat the MLS All-Stars 5–2.

On January 25, 2012, Venezuela played a friendly match with Mexico, with Mexico winning 3–1. On May 31, 2013, Mexico played another friendly, with Nigeria, which ended in a 2–2 draw.

In June 2016, NRG Stadium hosted two matches in the group stage and one semifinal in the Copa América Centenario. Costa Rica beat Colombia 3-2. Mexico and Venezuela drew 1-1. Argentina beat United States 4-0. Lionel Messi scored a free kick, making him Argentina's all-time leading scorer.

2026 FIFA World Cup

NRG Stadium will host multiple matches during the 2026 World Cup. It is one of eleven US venues which have been selected. It is also one of two venues in Texas which have been selected to host matches, the other being AT&T Stadium in the Dallas-Fort Worth Metroplex. During the event, the stadium will be temporarily renamed to "Houston Stadium" in accordance with FIFA's policy on corporate sponsored names.

College basketball
The stadium has hosted the NCAA Division I men's basketball tournament several times, including the 2008, 2010 & 2015 South Regional semifinals and finals, and the Final Four in 2011 and 2016. It will host the Final Four again in 2023.

Motorsports 
For the past eighteen years, NRG Stadium has played host to Monster Jam. Also, it has hosted a round of the AMA Supercross Championship since 2003, replacing the Astrodome which had been host since 1974.

Concerts
The stadium is a regular concert venue and has featured performers such as The Rolling Stones, Metallica, Beyoncé, U2, Guns N' Roses, Taylor Swift, and Coldplay over the years. When Taylor Swift returned in 2023 for The Eras Tour, it became the first act in stadium history to sell out three shows on a single tour.

Hockey
On September 23, 2011 the Dallas Stars and the Phoenix Coyotes were scheduled to play a preseason game. This proposed game was later canceled citing costs to put ice in the stadium.

Other events
Rice University uses executive offices in the stadium to teach a professional sports management class.

The Howdy Modi event was held on September 22, 2019 by Texas India Forum.

During the summer of 2019, the stadium hosted two international conventions of Jehovah's Witnesses, gathering thousands of delegates from around the world.

See also
Astrodome
History of Houston
List of current National Football League stadiums

Notes

External links

 
 NRG Stadium at StadiumDB.com
 NRG Stadium Seating Chart

Sports venues completed in 2002
National Football League venues
NCAA bowl game venues
Retractable-roof stadiums in the United States
Rodeo venues in the United States
CONCACAF Gold Cup stadiums
2026 FIFA World Cup Stadiums
American football venues in Houston
Houston Texans stadiums
Big 12 Championship Game venues
2002 establishments in Texas
Music venues in Houston
Wrestling venues in Houston
Soccer venues in Houston
College basketball venues in the United States
NCAA Division I men's basketball tournament Final Four venues
Basketball venues in Texas